Peter Allerton Sutton (born 18 July 1959) was Archdeacon of the Isle of Wight from 2011 to 2018.

Sutton was educated at Exeter University. He held Curacies at Holy Trinity, Fareham and St Mary, Alverstoke. He was Vicar of St Faith, Lee-on-the-Solent from 2003 to 2012. As of September 2018, Sutton serves as parish priest for the villages of Greatham, Empshott, Hawkley and Priors Dean.

References

1959 births
Alumni of the University of Exeter
Archdeacons of the Isle of Wight
Living people